Marion E. Hay (December 9, 1865November 21, 1933) was an American politician who served as the seventh governor of Washington from 1909 to 1913.

Biography
Born in Adams County, Wisconsin, Hay attended the Bayless Commercial Business College in Dubuque, Iowa. He married Lizzie L. Muir in Jackson on January 16, 1887, and they had six children, Raymond M., Moon M., Edward M., Bruce M., Rance M., Katherine J., and Margaret E.

Career

Hay moved to Washington Territory in 1888, where he opened a store in Davenport, Washington and owned wheat ranches in eastern Washington and Canada. He moved to Wilbur, Washington in 1889 and served two terms as mayor of Wilbur from 1898 to 1902, as well as chairman of the Lincoln County Republican Party, and was an alternate to the Republican National Convention in 1900. He relocated to Spokane, Washington in 1908.

In 1908, Hay was elected as Lieutenant Governor of Washington, and he became Governor upon the death of Samuel G. Cosgrove, after only about two months in office in March 1909. He served the remainder of Cosgrove's unexpired term and left office in 1913. Focusing on corruption in state government, he called a special session of the legislature to investigate and impeach dishonest state officials. During his administration, the Workman's Compensation law and women's suffrage were enacted.

Defeated for election in 1912, he returned to manage his personal business interests and property holdings, and was chairman of the 12th District Regional Agricultural Credit Corporation.

Death
Hay died of a heart attack at his  office on November 21, 1933 and is interred at the mausoleum at Riverside Memorial Park, Spokane.

References

Further reading
Available online through the Washington State Library's Classics in Washington History collection

External links

Washington Secretary of State
National Governors Association

The Political Graveyard

American Presbyterians
Mayors of places in Washington (state)
Republican Party governors of Washington (state)
Lieutenant Governors of Washington (state)
People from Adams County, Wisconsin
1865 births
1933 deaths
Burials in Washington (state)
People from Lincoln County, Washington